Marinussaurus is a genus of the lizard family Gymnophthalmidae. The genus is monotypic, i.e. it has only one species, Marinussaurus curupira. It occurs in Brazil. The specific name is given after the Curupira, a mythological creature known from many regions in South America (e.g., Brazil, Argentina, Chile, Paraguay, and Uruguay)

References

Gymnophthalmidae
Lizard genera
Taxa named by Pedro L.V. Peloso
Taxa named by Kátia Cristina Machado Pellegrino
Taxa named by Miguel Trefaut Rodrigues
Taxa named by Teresa C.S. Ávila-Pires